Introduction to the Theory of Computation is a textbook in theoretical computer science, written by Michael Sipser and first published by PWS Publishing in 1997.

See also
Introduction to Automata Theory, Languages, and Computation by John Hopcroft and Jeffrey Ullman, an older textbook in the same field

References

External links
Information on Introduction to the Theory of Computation (by Michael Sipser)

Computer science books
Computational complexity theory
Theory of computation